Statistics of L. League in the 1999 season. Prima Ham FC Kunoichi won the championship.

First stage

Second stage

Championship Playoff 
Prima Ham FC Kunoichi 3 - 1 NTV Beleza
 Prima Ham FC Kunoichi won the championship.

League standings

League awards

Best player

Top scorers

Best eleven

Best young player

See also 
 Empress's Cup

External links 
  Nadeshiko League Official Site

Nadeshiko League seasons
L
Japan
Japan
1999 in Japanese women's sport